Alan Ferguson Rodger, Baron Rodger of Earlsferry  (18 September 1944 – 26 June 2011) was a Scottish academic, lawyer, and Justice of the Supreme Court of the United Kingdom.

He served as Lord Advocate, the senior Law Officer of Scotland, before becoming Lord Justice General and Lord President of the Court of Session, the head of the country's judiciary. He was then appointed a Lord of Appeal in Ordinary (Law Lord) and became a Justice of the Supreme Court when the judicial functions of the House of Lords were transferred to that Court.

Early life and career
Alan Rodger was born on 18 September 1944 in Glasgow, to Professor T Ferguson Rodger, Professor of Psychological Medicine at the University of Glasgow, and Jean Margaret Smith Chalmers, and educated at the private Kelvinside Academy in the city. He studied at the University of Glasgow, graduating with an MA, and at the University's School of Law, taking an LLB. He then studied at New College, Oxford—under David Daube, Regius Professor of Civil Law—where he graduated with an MA (by decree) and DPhil, and was Dyke Junior Research Fellow at Balliol College, Oxford, from 1969 to 1970 and a Fellow of New College from 1970 to 1972.

He became an advocate in 1974 and was Clerk of the Faculty of Advocates from 1976 to 1979. He was a Member of the Mental Welfare Commission for Scotland from 1981 to 1984, and was appointed Queen's Counsel in 1985. He was an Advocate Depute from 1985 to 1988 and was appointed Solicitor General for Scotland in 1989, being promoted to Lord Advocate in 1992, and was created a life peer as Baron Rodger of Earlsferry, of Earlsferry in the District of North East Fife on 29 April 1992, and was appointed to the Privy Council.

Judicial career
Rodger was appointed a Senator of the College of Justice, a judge of the High Court of Justiciary and Court of Session, in 1995, He became Lord Justice General and Lord President in 1996. He was appointed a Lord of Appeal in Ordinary in 2001, upon the retirement of Lord Clyde. He and nine other Lords of Appeal in Ordinary became Justices of the Supreme Court upon that body's inauguration on 1 October 2009.

Death
Lord Rodger of Earlsferry died on 26 June 2011 after a short illness. Scottish First Minister Alex Salmond, who provoked fury after criticising Rodger less than a month earlier, said he had made an "outstanding contribution" to Scottish public life.

Honours
Lord Rodger of Earlsferry was elected a Fellow of the British Academy in 1991, and the same year was the Maccabaean Lecturer at the Academy. He was appointed a Fellow of the Royal Society of Edinburgh and an Honorary Bencher at Lincoln's Inn in 1992, and an Honorary Bencher of the Inn of Court of Northern Ireland in 1998. Hon. Mem., SPTL, subseq. SLS, 1992; Corresp. Mem., Bayerische Akad. der Wissenschaften, 2001. Pres., Holdsworth Club, 1998–99. Hon. Fellow, American Coll. of Trial Lawyers, 2008. He received honorary degrees of Doctor of Laws (LLD) from the Universities of Glasgow (1995), Aberdeen (1999) and Edinburgh (2001).

Lord Rodger of Earlsferry had been the Visitor of St Hugh's College, Oxford, since 2003, High Steward of the University of Oxford since 2008, and an Honorary Professor at the University of Glasgow School of Law since July 2009.

Notable judgements
As Lord Justice General
Drury v Her Majesty's Advocate 2001 SCCR 583 – definition of murder in Scotland

As Justice of the Supreme Court
R (E) v Governing Body of JFS [2009] UKSC 15 – racial discrimination in religious school admissions (dissenting)
HJ and HT v Home Secretary [2010] UKSC 31 – homosexuality in asylum claims

References

External links
Lord Rodger of Earlsferry: Tributes and Bibliography

1944 births
2011 deaths
Rodger of Earlsferry
People educated at Kelvinside Academy
Alumni of the University of Glasgow
Alumni of New College, Oxford
Alumni of Balliol College, Oxford
Fellows of New College, Oxford
Fellows of the British Academy
Fellows of the Royal Society of Edinburgh
Solicitors General for Scotland
Lord Advocates
Members of the Judicial Committee of the Privy Council
Lords President of the Court of Session
Lords Justice-General
Judges of the Supreme Court of the United Kingdom
Members of the Faculty of Advocates
Scottish King's Counsel
20th-century King's Counsel
Senators of the College of Justice
Members of the Privy Council of the United Kingdom
Legal historians
Scholars of Roman law
Scottish legal scholars
Lawyers from Glasgow
Life peers created by Elizabeth II